Devil's Night is the debut studio album by American hip-hop supergroup D12. It was released on June 19, 2001, by Shady Records and Interscope Records. It was also the first album to be released on Shady Records, although the label had been active since 1999. Production was primarily handled by Eminem and Dr. Dre, with contributions by Mr. Porter, DJ Head, and Jeff Bass. The album features guest appearances by Obie Trice, Truth Hurts, and Dina Rae.

Devil's Night received mixed reviews from critics but was a commercial success, debuting at number one on the US Billboard 200 with 372,000 album sales in its first week. The album was supported by three singles: "Purple Pills", "Ain't Nuttin' But Music", and "Fight Music".

Background
The album was executive produced by Eminem, who had released his hugely successful third studio album, The Marshall Mathers LP, a year earlier. The album's title comes from the Devil's Night tradition, recognized in and around Detroit in which abandoned homes are set ablaze. This practice was so popular in Detroit that it was depicted in the film 8 Mile. The group recorded Devil's Night in memory of Bugz, who was killed in May 1999 just hours prior to a concert.

The song "Revelation" parodies "Another Brick in the Wall Part 2", where there are kids screaming and Eminem shouting "Wrong! Do it again!" and "If you don't eat yer meat, you can't have any pudding! You can't have any pudding if you don't eat yer meat!". During the chorus, Eminem also raps: "I don't wanna go to school, I don't need no education".

Release and promotion
The album produced three singles: "Purple Pills", "Ain't Nuttin' But Music", and "Fight Music". The single "Shit on You" was also included as a bonus track on limited edition copies of the album. The album features two songs with disses aimed at Limp Bizkit, one a subtle reference in "Pistol Pistol" by Bizzare and another a hidden track by Eminem called "Girls", which is a diss track aimed at Limp Bizkit, DJ Lethal, Dilated Peoples, and Everlast. The album's cover depicts a matchbook on fire with the groups "D12" logo superimposed on it.

In August 2001, while on promotion for the album, D12 and Esham were kicked off the Warped Tour after members of the group allegedly physically attacked Esham over the lyrics of his song "Chemical Imbalance", which contained a reference to Eminem's daughter. Eminem was not present during the tour.

Censored material
On the censored version of the album, alternate versions of "Purple Pills" and "Fight Music" were included, entitled "Purple Hills" and "Flight Music". "Shit Can Happen", "Pistol Pistol", and "Pimp Like Me", were also edited, removing the offensive content from their titles. The "Dirty Edition" was available in both Europe and the United Kingdom. However, some versions swap the running order, making "Shit on You" track three and "These Drugs" track one.
The rare censored version of the album did not remove all expletives, as words like "ass", "asshole", "faggot", "nigga", "pussy", "hoe", "whore", "slut", "tits", "nuts" and "goddamn" were permissible on the album, as well as most sex references. Mostly violence and heavy drug use are removed on the edited version. The physical copies of the clean version mistakenly list "Girls" as the 18th track after "Revelation", even though "Girls" was not supposed to be listed on the back cover at all.

Commercial performance
The album debuted at number one on the Billboard 200, with approximately 371,881 copies sold during the first week of release. It re-entered the number one spot in its third week of release with approximately 173,956 copies sold, overtaking Alicia Keys' Songs in A Minor by just 306 copies. Ultimately, the album was certified platinum by a two-week stay at number one and twenty-two weeks on the chart overall.

The album debuted at number two on the UK Albums Chart, with approximately 57,967 copies sold during the first week of release. Ultimately, the album was certified platinum; total sales of the album stand at 436,977 as of December 2017.

Critical reception

Devil's Night was met with mixed reviews from music critics. At Metacritic, which assigns a normalized rating out of 100 to reviews from professional publications, the album received an average score of 58 based on 11 reviews, indicating "mixed or average reviews".

Nathan Brackett of Rolling Stone gave the album three stars out of five, writing, "If the Slim Shady and Marshall Mathers albums were slapstick trips into one man's psychosis - like the Marx Brothers starring in Taxi Driver - then Devil's Night is Friday the 13th by the Farrelly brothers [...] with results varying from silly to just dumb", though he felt that the album's redeeming qualities lied in the album's production and Eminem's lyricism, writing, "Devil's Nights high points are some of the most accomplished hip-hop we'll hear this year." Jason Birchmeier of AllMusic wrote, "Besides the remarkable production, Eminem also showcases his songwriting genius on several of the song's hooks, bringing a catchy pop-rap approach to hardcore lyrics." Q Magazine also awarded the album three stars out of five, describing it as "a slightly tweaked re-run of The Marshall Mathers LP, with a couple of stonking singles." NME gave Devil's Night a 7 out of 10, stating that it is "Eminem's most misogynistic, homophobic, violent and anally fixated trip to date. Like all his work it's offensive, defensive and, somehow, still quite charming." The Source gave the record three and half out of five mics. As many of the magazine's editors were feuding with D12 at the time of the review, namely Benzino, the rating is usually considered biased.

Despite mixed reviews, the album gained a strong following after its release. Denaun Porter stated in a 2020 interview that he is really pleased with the project: "That album, man, when I think about it, there wasn’t a lot of skippers on that album. It was really well put together." On June 18, 2021, in celebration of the album's 20th anniversary, an "Expanded Edition" was released, which contains all three songs from the album's Limited Edition bonus disc along with a new track, "Freestyle", four new instrumentals, and an acapella version of "Shit On You".

Awards and nominations

Track listing

Notes
 signifies an additional producer.
 signifies a co-producer.
"Shit On You" contains an interpolation of "Make 'Em Say Uhh" by Master P.
"Shit On You" was the commercial debut single of the group, being released in December 2000.
"Words Are Weapons" originally appeared on DJ Funkmaster Flex's mixtape The Mix Tape, Vol. IV.
"These Drugs" originally appeared on the soundtrack of the 2001 horror film Bones.

Sample credits
"Shit Can Happen" contains a sample of "Just Another Case" as performed by Cru.
"Pistol Pistol" contains a sample of "Kick in the Door" as performed by The Notorious B.I.G.
"Nasty Mind" contains a sample of "Ain't No Fun (If the Homies Can't Have None)" as performed by Snoop Dogg featuring Nate Dogg, Kurupt and Warren G.
"Ain't Nuttin' but Music" contains a sample of "Turn Off the Radio" as performed by Ice Cube.
"That's How..." contains a sample of "(Don't Worry) if There's a Hell Below, We're All Going to Go" as performed by Curtis Mayfield.
"Fight Music" contains a sample of "Kashmir" as performed by Led Zeppelin.
"Instigator" contains a sample of "Under the Influence" as performed by D12.
"Steve Berman" contains a sample of "The Way I Am" as performed by Eminem.
"Revelation" contains a sample of "Another Brick in the Wall (Part II)" and "In the Flesh" as performed by Pink Floyd.
"Girls" contains a sample of "Rollin'" as performed by Limp Bizkit.
"Shit On You" contains samples of "In the Beginning" as performed by Lonnie Smith and "Vivrant Thing" as performed by Q-Tip.

Personnel
Jeff Bass – bass and keyboards on tracks 2, 3, 7, 9, 10, 12, 13, 14, 16 and 22; bass on track 19; guitars on tracks 3, 7, 9, 13, 14, 16 and 22
DJ Head – drum programming on tracks 3, 7, 10, 13, 16 and 19
Mike Elizondo – guitars on tracks 5, 6, 11 and 18; bass on tracks 5, 6 and 11; keyboards on tracks 5 and 11
Scott Storch – keyboards on tracks 6, 11 and 18
Camara Kambon – keyboards on track 5
Ray Gale – harmonica on track 10
Traci Nelson – backing vocals on track 11
Dina Rae – vocals on track 13
Luis Resto – keyboards on track 19

Charts

Weekly charts

Year-end charts

Certifications

References

External links
 

2001 debut albums
D12 albums
Shady Records albums
Albums produced by Dr. Dre
Albums produced by Eminem
Albums produced by Scott Storch
Albums produced by Mr. Porter
Horrorcore albums